Giovanni Vincenzo Acquaviva d'Aragona  (born between 1490 and  1495 in Naples in Italy, died 16 August 1546 in Itri) was a Cardinal of the Roman Catholic Church. He became bishop of Melfi and Rapolla in 1537.

Life
Belonging to an illustrious and powerful noble family from the south, Giovanni Vincenzo Acquaviva d'Aragona was born in Naples, the son of Andrea Matteo III Acquaviva d'Aragona, eighth duke of Atri, 15th Count of Conversano and Count of Caserta, and his wife Isabella Piccolomini. His nephew, Claudio Acquaviva, son of his brother Giannantonio Donato, 9th Duke of Atri, was the fifth General of the Jesuits.  

In February 1537, he was elected bishop of the diocese of Melfi and Rapolla; and in June that same year, Archpriest of Santa Maria in Platea di San Flaviano. He was made cardinal by Pope Paul III on 2 June 1542 and Prefect of Castle Sant'Angelo. Ten days later, he was given the titular seat of San Martino ai Monti. He died August 16, 1546 in Itri.

Grand-uncle of Cardinals Giulio Acquaviva d'Aragona and Ottavio Acquaviva d'Aragona (seniore) (1591). Other cardinals of the family are Ottavio Acquaviva d'Aragona (iuniore) (1654); Francesco Acquaviva d'Aragona (1706); Troiano Acquaviva d'Aragona (1732); and Pasquale Acquaviva d'Aragona (1770).

Giulio Acquaviva d'Aragona

Giulio Acquaviva d'Aragona (1546–1574) was an Italian Roman Catholic cardinal.
Giulio Acquaviva d'Aragona was born in Naples in 1546, the son of patricians Giangirolamo Acquaviva d'Aragona, (great-grandson of Andrea Matteo Acquaviva, 8th Duke of Atri).  His mother was Margherita Pio di Carpi. He was the grand-nephew of Cardinal Giovanni Vincenzo Acquaviva d'Aragona and nephew of Claudio Acquaviva, the Superior General of the Jesuits. His brother Ottavio Acquaviva d'Aragona (seniore) also became cardinal and another brother, Rodolfo Acquaviva, is remembered for becoming a Christian martyr in India. 

He moved to Rome in 1566.  There, he became a Referendary of the Apostolic Signatura. Pope Pius V sent him as ambassador to Phillip II of Spain in an attempt to resolve a question of ecclesiastical jurisdiction. He accomplished this mission successfully, earning the goodwill of the pope.

Pope Pius V made him a cardinal deacon in the consistory of May 17, 1570. He received the red hat and the deaconry of San Teodoro on June 9, 1570.  He attended Pope Pius V on his deathbed. He participated in the papal conclave of 1572 that elected Pope Gregory XIII.

He died in Rome on July 21, 1574 at the age of twenty-eight. He was buried in the Archbasilica of St. John Lateran.

References

1490s births
1546 deaths
16th-century Italian cardinals
Cardinals created by Pope Pius V
Bishops of Melfi
16th-century Neapolitan people
Giovanni Vincenzo Acquaviva d'Aragona